Swami Yogananda Giri is a Hindu religious figure in Italy. He was the founder of the Unione Induista Italia.

Early life
Yogananda was born in Italy and converted to Hinduism when he was a teenager. After immigrating to India, he learned Sanskrit and became learned in South Indian Agamas. He was initiated as a renunciate monk in 1982. In 1985, he established the Gitananda Ashram in Savona.

See also
Hinduism in Italy

External links
Italy's Hindu Controversy Hinduism Today - September 1997
 How to Become a Hindu Hinduism Today - November 2000
Hinduism Hinduism Today - June 1999

Italian Hindus
Converts to Hinduism
Living people
20th-century Hindu religious leaders
Indian people of Italian descent
Year of birth missing (living people)